KSVY (91.3 FM) is a radio station based in Sonoma, California. The station is owned by Sonoma Valley Community Communications, Inc.

External links
 

Sonoma, California
SVY
Community radio stations in the United States
Radio stations established in 2005
2005 establishments in California